Weld Land District is one of the land districts of Western Australia, which is located within the Eastern Land Division in the north-eastern Goldfields region of the state.

Location
Its main centre of population is the town of Laverton, and it also includes the former towns of Mount Morgans, Mount Margaret, Burtville and Yundamindera to the west and the Mount Weld mine site to the south. It spans roughly 28°10'S - 29°00'S in latitude and 122°00'E - 123°30'E in longitude.

History
The district was created on 25 November 1901 and was defined in the Government Gazette:

References

Land districts of Western Australia
Goldfields-Esperance